Fairmount Township is a township in Butler County, Kansas, USA.  As of the 2000 census, its population was 511.

History
Fairmount Township was organized in 1873.

Geography

Cemeteries
The township contains the following cemeteries:
 Fairmount Cemetery
 Pleasant View Cemetery.
 Zion Cemetery.

Further reading

References

External links
 Butler County Website
 City-Data.com
 Butler County Maps: Current, 1936

Townships in Butler County, Kansas
Townships in Kansas